Gu Junjie (born 7 March 1988) is a Chinese footballer currently playing as a goalkeeper for Zibo Cuju.

Career statistics

Club
.

References

1988 births
Living people
Chinese footballers
Association football goalkeepers
China League One players
Shenyang Dongjin F.C. players
Yunnan Flying Tigers F.C. players
Xinjiang Tianshan Leopard F.C. players
Zibo Cuju F.C. players